"PYD" ("Put You Down") is a single by Canadian singer Justin Bieber, featuring vocals from American singer R. Kelly. It was released on November 18, 2013. The song is the seventh in Bieber's series Music Mondays, the first six being "Heartbreaker" (October 7, 2013), "All That Matters" (October 14), "Hold Tight" (October 21), "Recovery" (October 28), "Bad Day" (November 4), and "All Bad" (November 11). Bieber released a new single every week for 10 weeks from October 7 to December 9, 2013.

Background
“I just did a song [with him]. [Bieber] just called me to do a song and it’s hot. He wanted to go and do some R&B stuff so we got together and did that", R. Kelly told Vibe on November 12, 2013, at a private listening session of Black Panties.

Track listing

Charts

References

2013 singles
Justin Bieber songs
R. Kelly songs
2013 songs
Songs written by R. Kelly
Songs written by Justin Bieber
Song recordings produced by the Audibles
Island Records singles
Songs written by James Giannos
Songs written by Dominic Jordan
Songs written by Sasha Sirota
Songs written by Mally Mall